Paul Caulford M.D. is an advocate, an academic, and a family doctor in Scarborough, Toronto who provides free healthcare to refugees, undocumented migrants and other newcomers who are unable to get healthcare through the formal channels.

He was the chief of family medicine and was the community services director at Scarborough Hospital when the SARS epidemic hit Canada hardest in 2003 and he co-founded the Canadian Centre for Refugee and Immigrant Health Care.

Caulford publishes academic papers and advocates for immigrants and refugees to have full access to the Canadian healthcare system.

Education 
Caulford has a obtained a bachelor's degree of science in 1972, a master's of science in 1975 and a degree in medicine in 1978 all from the University of Toronto.

He while studying, he also spent his summers learning with a pathology professor at The Hospital for Sick Children.

Career

Academia 
Caulford is an Assistant Professor at the University of Toronto's Department of Family and Community Medicine.

Scarborough Hospital 
Caulford worked as the chief of family medicine and was the community services director at Scarborough Hospital during the SARS epidemic in 2003. His analysis of the state of Canada's healthcare system and his critique of mankind's treatment of planet earth are quoted in page one of the 2022 book Turkey and the Post-Pandemic World Order. He points out how the healthcare systems both in Canada and internationally were incapable of responding to the pandemic and called for investments to create more robust systems.

Canadian Centre for Refugee and Immigrant Health Care 
In 2000, Caulford and nurse Jennifer D’Andrade co-founded the Canadian Centre for Refugee and Immigrant Health Care (CCRIHC), which is located in a converted church at 4158 Sheppard Avenue East. By early 2021, CCRIH treated patients 40,000 times. The clinic provides free healthcare to immigrants and refugees who would otherwise be without access to healthcare three days a week.

In 2017, Caulford treated an increasing number of women and children arriving in the back of trucks arriving in Canada via USA. He treated frostbite, mental health conditions, malnutrition, respiratory problems, and provided reproductive health services.

During the COVID-19 pandemic, Caulford provided family medicine services online and face-to-face in a tent. In April 2020 he called for more doctors to support his tent clinic.

Advocacy 
In 2012, Caulford called for the Federal Government of Canada to provider better healthcare for refugees and simper administration procedures to encourage doctors to register in the government's refugee health funding program.

He criticized Donald Trump's immigration policies in 2017, and in 2019 he advocated against the deportation of a family from Canada.

In January 2020, Caulford spoke of the need for COVID-19 vaccines to be provided outside of normal working hours. Later in 2020, he launched a successful advocacy campaign to persuade the Federal Government of Canada and the Government of Ontario to provide hospital care to people without documentation.

In 2021, Caulford spoke about how many poor people have moved away from the centre of Toronto to Scarborough.

Scarborough Women Assessment and Need 
Caulford runs the Scarborough Women Assessment and Need program that provides counselling and reproductive health care to vulnerable women in Scarborough.

Filling the Gap Dental Outreach 
Caulford and Dr. Amanda Morel (dentist) co-founded Filling the Gap Dental Outreach to provide free dental services to people on low incomes.

Selected publications 
 Paul Caulford and Yasmin Vali, Providing health care to medically uninsured immigrants and refugees, CMAJ April 25, 2006 174 (9) 1253-1254; DOI: https://doi.org/10.1503/cmaj.051206

 Paul Caulford, Gar Bloch, & Ritika Goel, Waiting for care: Effect of Ontario's 3-month waiting period for OHIP on landed immigrants, 2013, Canadian Family Physician, 59(6)
 Paul Caulford & J D'Andrade, Health care for Canada's medically uninsured immigrants and refugees: Whose problem is it?, 2012, Canadian Family Physician, 58(7) p725-727
 Norman GR, Davis DA, Lamb S, Hanna E, Caulford P, Kaigas T. Competency Assessment of Primary Care Physicians as Part of a Peer Review Program. JAMA. 1993;270(9):1046–1051. doi:10.1001/jama.1993.03510090030007

Awards 
Caulford, and his team at the Canadian Centre for Refugee and Immigrant Health Care, received the Public Health Champion Award in 2008. Also in 2008 he received the Government of Ontario's Newcomer champion awards.

Caulford received the Ontario College of Family Physicians Regional Family Physician of the Year Award in 2017.

He was one of five physicians recognized by Toronto Life for his inspiring work in 2020.

Caulford was inducted into the Scarborough Walk of Fame and received his Star in 2022 in recognition of his contributions during the 2003 SARS Crisis in Toronto and for providing health equity to medically uninsured refugees and undocumented newcomers in Canada.

See also 

 Refugee health care in Canada
 Ontario Health Insurance Plan

References 

Living people
Canadian founders
University of Toronto alumni
Canadian health activists
Academic staff of the University of Toronto
Year of birth missing (living people)
Canadian general practitioners
21st-century Canadian physicians